Juye is a county in western Shandong province which is under the administration of Heze municipality. The county is 1,303 square km in area and has a population of approximately 910,000.

History
Juye originally belonged to Huxi prefecture.

Qing & Republic
Juye was the site of the "Juye Incident" on November 1, 1897. The murder of Christian missionaries was used by the German Empire as an excuse to occupy Jiaozhou Bay.

Liberation
From 1949 to 1952 Huxi prefecture (Juye and the other county-level parts) was under the provincial administration of Pingyuan.

In April 1953 Huxi was dismantled and its parts shared out. Juye then came into its present municipal region of Heze.

Administrative divisions
As 2012, this County is divided to 2 subdistricts and 15 towns.
Subdistricts
 Fenghuang Subdistrict
 Yongfeng Subdistrict

Towns

Climate

References

External links
Juye Online (Chinese)
Juye Merchant Network (Chinese)

Counties of Shandong
Heze